The World Federation of Democratic Youth (WFDY) is an international youth organization, and has historically characterized itself as left-wing and anti-imperialist. WFDY was founded in London in 1945 as a broad international youth movement, organized in the context of the end of World War II with the aim of uniting youth from the Allies behind an anti-fascist platform that was broadly pro-peace, anti-nuclear war, expressing friendship between youth of the capitalist and socialist nations. The WFDY Headquarters are in Budapest, Hungary. The main event of WFDY is the World Festival of Youth and Students. The last festival was held in Sochi, Russia, in October 2017. It was one of the first organizations granted general consultative status with the United Nations Economic and Social Council.

History 
On 10 November 1945, the World Youth Conference, organized in London, founded the World Federation of Democratic Youth. This historic conference was convened at the initiative of the World Youth Council which was formed during the Second World War to bring together the youth movements of the allied nations in an anti-fascist front. The conference was attended by over 600 delegates from 63 nations, it was at the time the largest and most diverse gathering of international youth. The conference adopted a pledge for peace.

Shortly after, with the onset of the Cold War and Winston Churchill's Iron Curtain speech, the organization was accused by the US State Department of being a "Moscow front". Many of the founding organizations quit, leaving mostly youth from socialist nations, national liberation movements, and communist youth. Like the International Union of Students (IUS) and other pro-Soviet organizations, the WFDY became a target and victim of CIA espionage as well as part of active measures conducted by the Soviet state security.

The WFDY's first General Secretary, Alexander Shelepin, was a former leader of the Young Communist International which had been dissolved in 1943. Shelepin had been a guerilla fighter during World War II (after his work with the WFDY, he was appointed head of Soviet State Security). Both the WFDY and IUS vocally criticized the Marshall Plan, supported the Czechoslovak coup d'état of 1948 and the new People's republics in eastern Europe. They opposed the Korean War.

The main event of the WFDY became the World Festival of Youth and Students, a large-scale political and cultural celebration which aimed to promote peace and friendship between the youth of the world. Most, but not all, of the early festivals were held in socialist nations in Europe. During the 1960s, 1970s, and 1980s the WFDY's festivals were one of the few places where young people from the western bloc could meet youth involved in the campaign against apartheid from South Africa, or militant youth from Vietnam, Palestine, Cuba and other nations. Famous people who participated in festivals included Angela Davis, Yuri Gagarin, Yasser Arafat, Fidel Castro, Ruth First, Jan Myrdal and Nelson Mandela.

When the Soviet Union and the Eastern Bloc collapsed, the WFDY entered a crisis. With the power vacuum left by the collapse of the most important member organization, the Soviet Komsomol, there were conflicting views of the future character of the organization. Some wanted a more apolitical structure, whereas others were more inclined to an openly leftist federation. The WFDY, however, survived this crisis, and is today an active international youth organization that holds regular activities.

Pledge

General Assembly 
The WFDY conducts a General Assembly every four years, the last taking place in Nicosia in 2019. During the Assembly, leadership and a General Council are elected and an organizational declaration is approved.

Member organizations

Africa

Asia and the Pacific

Europe and North America

Latin America and Caribbean

North Africa and Middle East

Former members
  - Democratic Youth Organization of Afghanistan
 - Bashkimi i Rinisë së Punës së Shqipërisë
  - Juventud Intrasigente Argentina
  - Juventud Socialista Auténtica
  - Eureka Youth League
  - Graffiti Jeugendsdienst
  - Jeunesse Communiste de Belgique
  - Confederación Universitaria Boliviana
  - Juventude do PCB
  - Dimitrov Communist Youth Union
  - Leninist Communist Youth Union of Belarus
  - People's Revolutionary Youth Union of Kampuchea
  - Juventud de la Izquierda Cristiana de Chile
  - Juventud del MIR
  - Juventud Rebelde Miguel Enríquez
  - Unión de Jóvenes Socialistas
  - Communist Youth League of China
  - All-China Youth Federation
  - Federación Juvenil Obrera
  - Juventud de la Alianza Nacional Popular
  - Juventud del Poder Popular
  - Unión Nacional de los Estudiantes Secundarios
  - Unión de Jóvenes Patriotas
  - Union de la jeunesse congolaise, Republic of Congo
  - Juventud del Pueblo Costarriquense
  - Juventudes Patrióticas
  - Juventud Vanguardista Costarriquense
  - Union of Czech Youth
  - Union of Slovak Youth
  - Czechoslovak Youth Union
  - Czechoslovak Socialist Youth Union
  - Juventud Revolucionaria Dominicana
  - Unión Democrática Orlando Martínez
  - Departamento Juvenil del Central de Trabajadores de Ecuador
  - Juventud Comunista de Ecuador
  - Asociación General de Estudiantes Universitarios de El Salvador
  - Føroyskir Sosialistar
  - Democratic Youth League of Finland
  - Finnish Union of Democratic Pioneers
  - Socialist Youth League Karl Liebknecht
  - Greek Communist Youth (Internal)
  - Maurice Bishop Youth Movement
  - Union de la Jeunesse Communiste Guadeloupe
  - Union nationale des étudiants de france-Solidarité Etudiante
  - Juventud Patriótica del Trabajo
  - Young Socialist Movement
  - Jeunesse Communiste de Haiti
  - Federación de la Juventud Comunista
  - Revolutionary Communist Youth League
  - People's Youth (Indonesia)
  - Italian Communist Youth Federation
  - Young Communist League of the Workers' Party (Workers Party of Jamaica)
  - Democratic Youth League of Japan
  - Jeunesse Communiste Luxembourgoise
  - Union de la Jeunesse Communiste Martinique
  - Frente Juvenil Revolucionario
  - Juventud Socialista de los Trabajadores
  - Revolutionary Youth League (REVSOMOL)
  - Istiqlal Party Youth
  - Algemeen Nederlands Jeugd Verbond
  - Kommunista Ifjúsági Szövetség
  - Juventud del PRD
  - Juventud Popular Revolucionaria
  - Federación Juvenil Comunista de Paraguay
  - CGTP Sección Juvenil
  - Juventud Aprista Peruana
  - Juventud Mariateguista
  - Związek Socjalistycznej Młodzieży Polskiej
  - Federación Universitaria para la Indpendencia
  - Juventud Comunista de Puerto Rico
  - Juventud Socialista de Puerto Rico
  - Federazione Giovanile Comunista San Marino
  - Union of Democratic Youth in Saudi
  - Congress of Sama Samaja Youth Leagues
  - Federation of Communist and Progressive Youth
  - Vanguard Youth Organization
  - National Youth Movement
  - Ung Vänster (1975–1992)
  - Jeunesse Communiste Suisse
  - Destourian Youth
  - İlerici Gençler Derneği
  - Komsomol of Ukraine
  - Young Socialist Alliance
  - Juventud Socialista del Uruguay
  - Committee of Youth Organizations of the USSR
  - All-Union Leninist Young Communist League (Komsomol)
  - Juventud Socialista-MEP

Observers
 Youth for Communist Rebirth In France (Youth of the Pole of Communist Rebirth in France)
 Communist Youth of Luxemburg (Refounded youth organisation of the Communist Party of Luxembourg), Luxembourg
 Revolutionary Communist Youth (Youth organization of the Communist Party), Sweden

See also 
 Christian Peace Conference
 International Association of Democratic Lawyers
 International Federation of Resistance Fighters – Association of Anti-Fascists
 International Organization of Journalists
 International Union of Students
 Women's International Democratic Federation
 World Federation of Scientific Workers
 World Federation of Trade Unions
 World Peace Council

Notes

References

External links 
 

 
Youth wings of political parties
Youth wings of communist parties
Foreign relations of the Soviet Union
Propaganda in the Soviet Union
Cold War espionage
Communist front organizations
Youth organizations established in 1945
International Socialist Organisations